Seridó Oriental is a microregion in the Brazilian state of Rio Grande do Norte. It has a total area of 3,825.73 square kilometers (1,477.1 sq mi).

Municipalities 
The microregion consists of the following municipalities:
 Acari
 Carnaúba dos Dantas
 Cruzeta
 Currais Novos
 Equador
 Jardim do Seridó
 Ouro Branco
 Parelhas
 Santana do Seridó
 São José do Seridó

References

Microregions of Rio Grande do Norte